Canta e Vinci was an Italian music quiz show devised by Fatma Ruffini and directed by Duccio Forzano on R.T.I. (Reti Televisive Italiane). based on an adaptation of the international series Don't Forget the Lyrics! (an original Fox show). Program was hosted by Amadeus (full name Amedeo Umberto Rita Sebastiani) and by Checco Zalone. The pilot episode was broadcast on 18 December 2007 with success, but the season suspended on 10 April 2008 because of poor showing, although some filmed episodes were shown during the summer of 2008.

The top prize of the Italian show was 250,000 euros. The competitor has three lifelines: asking for 2 missing words to be shown, the chance to call a friend or relative in the studio or ask one of three possible choices displayed. Massimo Martelli, Paolo Cuccia, Alfredo Morabito and Gennaro Nunziante took part in the various pilots and episodes.

The game show has come back on the air from 7 February 2022, on Nove presented by Gabriele Corsi, aired from Monday to Friday in access prime time with the title Don't Forget the Lyrics! - Stai sul pezzo.

Prizes

No one has won the Top Prize of €250,000, however, eight contestants made into the Final Song. Six contestants decided to walk away with €50,000, two contestants failed the Final Song.

Don't Forget the Lyrics!
Italian game shows
Musical game shows
Italia 1 original programming